"Waiting in the Wings" is a 1965 Australian television play. It was filmed in Melbourne.

Premise
At a nursing home for elderly actresses, a newcomer causes trouble.

Cast
 Patricia Kennedy
 Moira Carleton

Reception
The critic from The Sydney Morning Herald thought that the "75 minutes were engagingly spent" with strong acting and direction.

References

External links
 Waiting in the Wings at National Film and Sound Archive

1965 television plays
1965 Australian television episodes
1960s Australian television plays
Wednesday Theatre (season 1) episodes